Dexter is a town in Wood County, Wisconsin, United States. The population was 379 at the 2000 census. The unincorporated communities of Dexterville and Veedum are located in the town.

Geography
According to the United States Census Bureau, the town has a total area of 35.5 square miles (92.0 km2), of which, 34.2 square miles (88.6 km2) of it is land and 1.3 square miles (3.4 km2) of it (3.69%) is water.

History
The six mile square that would become Dexter was first surveyed in the summer of 1851 by a crew working for the U.S. government. In November and December another crew marked all the section corners of the six mile square, walking through the woods and wading the swamps, measuring with chain and compass. When done, the deputy surveyor filed this general description:
Surface level, and principally swamp (Tamarack) excepting a narrow strip about forty chains wide on either Bank of Yellow River and Sections 4. 5. 8. 9. 16, 17, and North half of 20. soil 2 rate Hard Pan. Timber on Sections 8. 9. 16. 17 1st rate Pine. The balance of the Township is covered with thick small Pine and Tamarack. with a very thick crop of underbrush(?) - Alder(?) Swamp Birch witch Hazel and small Pine. Hiles and Seal's Saw Mill and dweling situated on the South-west quarter of Section 14. Williams saw mill and dweling House situated about the center of Section 10.

Dexter township takes its name from the community of Dexterville.

Demographics
As of the census of 2000, there were 379 people, 144 households, and 110 families residing in the town. The population density was 11.1 people per square mile (4.3/km2). There were 190 housing units at an average density of 5.6 per square mile (2.1/km2). The racial makeup of the town was 98.68% White, 0.26% African American, 0.79% Native American, and 0.26% from two or more races. Hispanic or Latino of any race were 0.26% of the population.

There were 144 households, out of which 32.6% had children under the age of 18 living with them, 66.0% were married couples living together, 3.5% had a female householder with no husband present, and 23.6% were non-families. 17.4% of all households were made up of individuals, and 9.7% had someone living alone who was 65 years of age or older. The average household size was 2.63 and the average family size was 3.02.

In the town, the population was spread out, with 25.3% under the age of 18, 6.1% from 18 to 24, 30.6% from 25 to 44, 26.1% from 45 to 64, and 11.9% who were 65 years of age or older. The median age was 39 years. For every 100 females, there were 115.3 males.  For every 100 females age 18 and over, there were 114.4 males.

The median income for a household in the town was $43,750, and the median income for a family was $50,972. Males had a median income of $34,625 versus $22,321 for females. The per capita income for the town was $19,060.  About 1.8% of families and 4.0% of the population were below the poverty line, including 4.5% of those under age 18 and 11.3% of those age 65 or over.

References

External links 
 1852 plat map covering town of Dexter
 1879 plat map
 1896 plat map
 1909 plat map
 1928 plat map
 1956 plat map

Towns in Wood County, Wisconsin
Towns in Wisconsin